The Billboard Tropical Airplay chart ranks the best-performing tropical songs of the United States. Published by Billboard magazine, the data are compiled by Nielsen Broadcast Data Systems based collectively on each single's weekly airplay.

Chart history

See also
 List of number-one Billboard Top Latin Songs of 2013

References

United States Tropical Songs
2013
2013 in Latin music